Dromedary is a rural residential locality in the local government areas (LGA) of Southern Midlands and Brighton in the Central and Hobart LGA regions of Tasmania. The 2016 census recorded a population of 732 for the state suburb of Dromedary.

History 
Dromedary was gazetted as a locality in 1970. 

Mount Dromedary, which is in the locality, was so named in 1794 by Captain John Hayes because of its resemblance to a camel.

Geography
Many of the boundaries of the locality consist of survey lines. The Derwent River forms the south-eastern boundary.

Road infrastructure 
Route B10 (Boyer Road) passes through from south-east to south-west.

References

Towns in Tasmania
Localities of Southern Midlands Council
Localities of Brighton Council (Tasmania)